Herschel Sizemore (August 6, 1935 – September 9, 2022) was an American mandolinist in the bluegrass tradition.

Biography

Early years
Sizemore was raised in Leighton, Alabama, near Muscle Shoals. When he was age eight, Sizemore's parents took him to see a performance by Bill Monroe at the Grand Ole Opry.

Music career
The first portion of Sizemore's career was spent playing in established bluegrass bands. From 1957 until 1965, Sizemore played with the Dixie Gentlemen with Jake Landers and Rual Yarbrough. 
In 1971, the Dixie Gentlemen reunited for a period of time.

Sizemore was a member of The Boys from Shiloh in 1966, along with Bobby Smith (lead vocal, guitar), Rual Yarbrough (baritone vocal, banjo), Charlie Nixon (resonator guitar), and Johnny Montgomery (bass). Sizemore then played with Jimmy Martin from 1967 until 1968.

From 1968 until 1974, Sizemore played with the Shenandoah Cut-Ups, trading solos with fiddler Tater Tate and flatpicker Wesley Golding.

Sizemore, Wesley Golding, and Tom McKinney left the Shenandoah Cut-Ups to form Country Grass, which lasted from 1974 until 1976. Other members included Tom Gray (bass, vocals), Ricky Skaggs (fiddle), and Ronnie Bucke (drums). Sizemore was also one of Del McCoury's Dixie Pals from 1978 until 1979. Other Pals included Jerry McCoury (upright bass), Dick Smith (banjo), and the late Sonny Miller (fiddle). The Dixie Pals (with Mike Hargrove) reunited at a 2012 benefit concert for Sizemore.

Sizemore was a member of the Bluegrass Cardinals from 1991 until 1995.

Solo recordings
In 1995, Sizemore formed the Herschel Sizemore Band. His first solo album Bounce Awa was released in 1979, and in 2000, Sizemore released the album My Style on Hay Holler with Jim Haley (guitar), Terry Baucom (banjo), and Eddie Biggerstaff and Ron Stewart (fiddle).

In 2009, Sizemore released the album B-Natural with Terry Baucom (banjo), Jimmy Haley (guitar), Ron Stewart (fiddle), (Mike Bub) (bass),and Alan Bibey (guitar, mandolin).

Mandolin in B
Sizemore and his wife Joyce were both diagnosed with cancer on the same day in fall 2011. On February 19, 2012, a benefit concert for the Sizemores was staged in Roanoke, Virginia. The documentary film Mandolin in B focused on Sizemore's life and music. The film was directed by Rick Bowman and released by Backyard Green Films.

Songwriting
Sizemore's best-known composition is the mandolin instrumental "Rebecca," named after his mother. It has been covered by several other artists.

Personal life and death
Sizemore died on September 9, 2022, at the age of 87.

Awards
In 2011, Sizemore was inducted into the Alabama Bluegrass Hall of Fame.

Discography

Solo albums
 1979: Bounce Away (County) listed on the album as "Hershel Sizemore"
 1993: Back in Business (Hay Holler)
 2000: My Style (Hay Holler)
 2009: B-natural (self-released)

Jake Landers and Herschel Sizemore
 2013: For Old Times Sake (B Sharp)

The Blue Ridge Mountain Boys
 1963: Blue Grass Back Home (Time)
 1963: Hootenanny N' Blue Grass (Time)

Shenandoah Valley Quartet
 1970: Shenandoah Valley Quartet with Jim Eanes (County)

The Shenandoah Cut-Ups
 1971: Bluegrass Autumn (Revonah)
 1971: Plant Grass (In Your Ear) (MRC)
 1971: Curly Seckler Sings Again (County) recorded with the Shenandoah Cut-Ups
 1973: The Shenandoah Cutups Sing Gospel (Revonah)
 1973: Shenandoah Cut Ups (Rebel)
 1974: Traditional Bluegrass (Revonah)
 1980: Keep It Bluegrass (Grassound)

The Dixie Gentlemen
 1963: The Country Style of the Dixie Gentlemen (United Artists)
 1973: Together Once More (Old Homestead)
 1973: Blues and Bluegrass (Old Homestead) with Tut Taylor and Vassar Clements

The Country Grass
 1974: Livin' Free (Rebel)

Roby Huffman and the Bluegrass Cutups
 1978: Colorado River (Grassound)

Del McCoury and the Dixie Pals
 1981: Take Me To the Mountains (Leather)

Bluegrass Cardinals
 1997: Mountain Girl (BGC)

As composer
 1971: Jake Landers and Tom McKinney - Present Original Songs and New Banjo Sounds of the 70's (Tune) - track 11, "Bluegrass Minor"
 1976: Bottle Hill - Light Our Way Along the Highway (Biograph) - track 12, "Bluegrass Autumn"
 1976: The Conner Brothers - The Conner Brothers (County) - track 10, "Bluegrass Minor"
 1981: The Landers Family - Old Folks Don't Live Here (Old Homestead) - track 4, "	I Thank God For America Today" (co-written with Jake Landers)
 1981: Al Wood and the Smokey Ridge Boys - Kentucky Country Home (Rich-R-Tone) - track 1, "Kentucky Country Home"
 1998: Jim Mills - Bound to Ride (Sugar Hill) - track 6, "Rebecca"

Also appears on
 1968: Rual Yarbrough - 5 String Banjo By Rual Yarbrough (Tune)
 1969: Jim Eanes - Rural Rhythm Presents Jim Eanes (Rural Rhythm)
 1969: Clarence "Tater" Tate - Rural Rhythm Presents Fiddling Clarence "Tater" Tate: More Favorite Waltzes (Rural Rhythm)
 1986: Tim Smith - Favorite Pastimes (Heritage)
 1994: David Parmley - Southern Heritage (Rebel)
 1998: Bill Harrell - The Cat Came Back (Rebel)
 2004: John Lawless - Five & Dime (Copper Creek)
 2005: Curly Seckler - Down in Caroline (Copper Creek)
 2005: Curly Seckler - That Old Book of Mine (County)
 2007: Curly Seckler - Bluegrass, Don't You Know (Copper Creek)
 2008: Lynwood Lunsford - Pick Along (Hay Holler)

Music instruction
 2001: Acutab Transcriptions Vol. 1 (Mel Bay) 
 2010: Herschel Sizemore: In His Own Style DVD (Mel Bay)

References

External links 
 
 
 

1935 births
2022 deaths
American bluegrass mandolinists
American mandolinists
Bluegrass musicians from Alabama
Country musicians from Alabama
People from Sheffield, Alabama